was a scholar-bureaucrat and diplomat of Ryūkyū Kingdom.

Life
Makishi was born in Shuri, the capital of Ryūkyū. He studied in Kokugaku (国学 the Royal Academy of Ryūkyū) in his early years.  In 1838, he traveled to China to study, and stayed in Beijing for several years.  When he came back to Ryūkyū, he learned English from Aniya Seiho (安仁屋 政輔).  He was then appointed Ikoku Tsūji (異国通詞, the diplomat towards Western countries) in 1844.

References
『沖縄大百科事典』、沖縄タイムス、1983年

1818 births
1862 deaths
People of the Ryukyu Kingdom
Ryukyuan people
Torture victims
1860s deaths